Tebogo Mamathu (born 27 May 1995) is a South African sprinter. She won a gold medal in the 4 × 100 metres relay at the 2016 African Championships and the silver at the 2019 African Games.

In 2019, she competed in the women's 100 metres event at the 2019 World Athletics Championships held in Doha, Qatar. She did not qualify to compete in the semi-finals.

International competitions

Personal bests
Outdoor
100 metres – 11.04 (+1.9 m/s, La Chaux-de-Fonds 2019)
200 metres – 23.69 (-0.2 m/s, Polokwane 2016)

References

External links
 

1995 births
Living people
South African female sprinters
Athletes (track and field) at the 2019 African Games
African Games silver medalists for South Africa
African Games medalists in athletics (track and field)
20th-century South African women
21st-century South African women